Vernon Wells (born 31 December 1945) is an Australian character actor. He began appearing on Australian television shows in the mid-1970s, such as Homicide, Matlock Police and All the Rivers Run. He is best known to international audiences for his role of Wez in the 1981 science fiction action film Mad Max 2: The Road Warrior and Bennett in the military action film Commando.

After Mad Max 2, Wells began appearing in Hollywood films, such as science fiction comedies Weird Science (1985) and Innerspace (1987). In the 2000s, Wells acted in the television series Power Rangers Time Force portraying the series' main villain Ransik.

Career

1970s
Wells worked in a quarry, then as a salesman, and then in theatre and rock bands. In the 1970s, he was selected by casting agents to appear in a theatre play, and he started to appear in Australian TV commercials, print advertisements, local Australian TV shows such as Homicide and Matlock Police and historical TV mini-series like Against The Wind, Sara Dane and All The Rivers Run.

His first cinema appearance was a minor role in Felicity (1979), a low-budget, erotic fantasy film.

1980s
Wells was cast as the homicidal biker Wez, in Mad Max 2 (1981), filmed around Silverton near Broken Hill in outback New South Wales, Australia. It is the role for which he is probably best known to international audiences, as Wells portrays a psychotic, post-apocalyptic henchman who relentlessly pursues hero Max Rockatansky (Mel Gibson), before meeting a spectacular death at the film's finale.

Hollywood beckoned for Wells, and he spoofed his mad biker role in the popular 1985 teen comedy Weird Science, written and directed by John Hughes and produced by Joel Silver. Wells so impressed Silver with his work in that film that he was immediately secured for the role of Bennett opposite Arnold Schwarzenegger in Commando (1985). When first approached for the role in Commando, Wells was in Australia working on the feature film, Fortress, based on the real-life Faraday School kidnapping, in a starring role opposite Rachel Ward. Wells appeared as Roo Marcus in Last Man Standing (1987).

1990s and 2000s
In 1992, Wells appeared in one of the few roles in which he is not cast as a villain, in the short-lived 1992 television comedy series The Amazing Live Sea Monkeys. The show was about a professor who accidentally enlarged three Sea-Monkeys to human-size, and then had to deal with their comical ineptness in the world. In 1993, Wells starred in the science fiction film Fortress with Christopher Lambert (no connection to the previous movie of the same name).

Many of Wells's roles 1990s and 2000s portrayed villains, as in the films Circuitry Man (1990), Kick of Death (1997), Starforce (2000) and Power Rangers Time Force (2001). In the Power Rangers episodes, he played the role of Ransik, a mutant crime lord from the year 3000 who travels back in time to take over the world. In 2002, he reprised this role for the Power Rangers Wild Force/Time Force two-part team-up episode "Reinforcements from the Future". Wells starred in the 2009 horror film Silent Night, Zombie Night.
Vernon Wells also starred in an award-winning role in “Trouble Is My Business”.

Selected filmography

Mad Max 2 (1981) as Wez
Weird Science (1985) as Lord General
Commando (1985) as Bennett
Fortress (1985) as Dabby Duck
MacGyver (1985) as Catlin
Coming of Age (1986) as Chuck Proby (Donald)
Hunter (1986) as Sonny Zajak
Innerspace (1987) as Mr. Igoe
Last Man Standing (1987) as Roo Marcus
P.I. Private Investigations (1987) as Detective North
Sunset (1988) as Houseman
MacGyver (1988) as Paul Donnay
 Nam Angels (1989)
American Eagle (1989) as Johnny Burke
Undeclared War (1990) as Hannibal (Sheng zhan feng yun)
Circuitry Man (1990) as Plughead
The Shrimp on the Barbie (1990) as Bruce
Fortress (1992) as Maddox
Ultimatum (1994) as Gerard Richter
Plughead Rewired: Circuitry Man II (1994) as Plughead
Manosaurus (1994) as Professor Sorenson
Space Truckers (1996) as Mr. Cutt
Billy Frankenstein (1998) as Otto von Sloane
Power Rangers Time Force (2001, TV Series) as Ransik
Power Rangers Wild Force (2002, TV Series) as Ransik
Beneath Loch Ness (2001) as Constable
Curse of the Forty-Niner (2003) as Jeremiah Stone 
Looney Tunes: Back in Action (2003) as Acme VP, Child Labor
Devil's Knight (2003) as Frank
King of the Ants (2003) as Beckett
Chastity (2005) as Trucker
The Strange Case of Dr. Jekyll and Mr. Hyde (2006) as Dr. Dennis Lanyon
Tru Loved (2007) as Coach Wesley
Green Street 2: Stand Your Ground (2009) as Tankersley Governor
The Drawn Together Movie: The Movie (2010) as Scott the Network Head
Silent Night, Zombie Night (2011) as Paul Irwin
Jurassic Attack (2013) as Agent Grimaldi
Throwback (2014) as Detective McNab
Jurassic City (2014) as Agent LaFranco
Relentless Justice (2015) as Mayor Jason Macendale 
Timber the Treasure Dog (2016) as Wolf (Voice)
The Perfect Weapon (2016) as The Interrogator
Death House (2017) as Nela 
Landfall (2017) as Wexler 
Der Vertrag (2017) as Cooper Ryan (Television film)
Trouble Is My Business  (2018) as Detective Barry Tate
Lilith (2018) as Phillip  
Loss Prevention (2018) as CEO Reginald Bachman
Glass Jaw (2018) as Happy
The City of Gold (2018) as The Inquisitor
Impact Event (2018) as Ed
Crossbreed (2019) as Murphy 
The Silent Natural (2019) as Sarah's Father
Eason's Gold (2019) as Eason 
Slayer: The Repentless Killogy (2019) as Prison Guard #1 
Zombies V the C.W.A. (2019) as Narrator (Short)
Emerald Run (2020) as Dodson
No Chance (2020) as Barrett Transformed
Debt Collectors (2020) as Cyrus Skinner 
Kill Giggles (2020) as Malcolm Fossor (Giggles) 
Await the Dawn (2020) as Zed
Maverick N Grundy (2020) as Wesley
Camp Twilight (2020) as Detective Bennett
Charlie's Christmas Wish (2020) as Hank Wentworth
Starspawn: Overture (2020) as Randolph Sutton (Short)
Social Distance (2020) as Gil Oldman Jr.
Red Snow (2021) as Julius King
Frost (2021) as Grant
The Price We Pay (2022) as The Doctor

Video games
Ty the Tasmanian Tiger 3: Night of the Quinkan (2005) Ridge
Darksiders (2010) Samael
Darksiders II (2012) Samael
Deus Ex: Mankind Divided (2016) Jim Miller 
Darksiders Genesis (2019) as Samael

Awards and nominations

References

1945 births
Australian male film actors
Australian male television actors
Australian male video game actors
Australian male voice actors
Living people
People from Victoria (Australia)